Lajos Nagy (born 11 March 1936) is a German water polo player. He competed at the 1960 Summer Olympics and the 1968 Summer Olympics.

References

1936 births
Living people
German male water polo players
Olympic water polo players of the United Team of Germany
Olympic water polo players of West Germany
Water polo players at the 1960 Summer Olympics
Water polo players at the 1968 Summer Olympics
Sportspeople from Budapest